Asen Rumenov Chandarov (born 13 November 1998) is a Bulgarian professional footballer who plays as a midfielder for Bulgarian First League club Levski Sofia.

Career

DIT, Septemvri and Pirin
Chandarov bеgan his youth career in DIT Sofia academy. In 2015 DIT, which was owned by his father Rumen Chandarov, bought Septemvri Sofia and Chandarov was promoted to the first team. In the beginning of 2016 he was sent on loan to Pirin Razlog until the end of the season.

Botev Plovdiv 
Chandarov begin the summer camp with Botev Plovdiv and later signed with the team. On 30 July 2016 he made his debut for the team in Parva Liga in a match against Lokomotiv Plovdiv.

Return to Septemvri 
Soon after his father left Botev, Chandarov also left the club and returned to Septemvri Sofia. He made his second debut for the team on 12 September 2016 in a match against Etar Veliko Tarnovo. On 29 October he scored the first goal for the 3:0 win against Tsarsko Selo.

On 29 March 2017 it was announced that due to injury got in the last match with Bulgaria U19, Chandarov would miss the end of season 2016-17 and the European Under-19 Championship in July 2017.

Chandarov returned in play on 30 November 2017 in a league match against CSKA Sofia coming on as a substitute.

International career

Youth levels
Chandarov was called up for the Bulgaria U19 team for the 2017 European Under-19 Championship qualification from 22 to 27 March 2017. Playing in all three matches, Bulgaria qualified for the knockout phase.

Career statistics

Club

References

External links
 
Profile at LevskiSofia.info

Living people
Footballers from Sofia
1998 births
Bulgarian footballers
Association football midfielders
First Professional Football League (Bulgaria) players
FC Septemvri Sofia players
FC Pirin Razlog players
Botev Plovdiv players
PFC Levski Sofia players
Liga I players
LPS HD Clinceni players
Bulgarian expatriate footballers
Expatriate footballers in Romania
Bulgarian expatriate sportspeople in Romania